

The Bank of Italy was founded in San Francisco, California, United States, on October 17, 1904, by Amadeo Pietro Giannini. It grew by a branch banking strategy to become Bank of America, the world's largest commercial bank, with 493 branches in California and assets of $5 billion in 1945.

History 

The bank was established to serve working class citizens of the area, especially Italian Americans living in San Francisco's North Beach neighborhood. The bank survived the San Francisco earthquake and fire of 1906, after Amadeo Pietro Giannini saw an approaching fire and filled the bank assets in the back of his horse drawn cart which he rode to his San Mateo home. It was one of the first banks to offer loans to businesses to help rebuild the city.

The first location of the bank was in Jackson Square in 1904, the original building is no longer standing but the location is the home of the Colombo Building (1909). The Bank of Italy building was opened in 1908—which later became a National Historic Landmark. Giannini had his office space in an open area on the first floor. In 1909, the bank began opening branches in other cities, beginning with San Jose. It had 24 branches by 1918, at which time it was the first statewide branch banking system.

The Bank of Italy merged with the smaller Bank of America, Los Angeles in 1928. In 1930, Giannini changed the name from "Bank of Italy" to "Bank of America". As chairman of the new, larger Bank of America, Giannini expanded the bank throughout his tenure, which continued until his death in 1949.  Giannini's life and his many innovations in banking figure prominently in Jim McKelvey, The Innovation Stack (Penguin, 2020).

Amadeo Giannini and the Bank of Italy were the basis for the classic 1932 Frank Capra movie American Madness, from the original screenplay "Faith" by Robert Riskin.

Bank of America merged with NationsBank of Charlotte, North Carolina, in 1998. While NationsBank was the nominal survivor, the merged bank took the Bank of America name and operates under the original charter for Bank of Italy.

See also

 Old Bank of America Building (San Jose, California) - Bank of Italy
 Bank of Italy, Merced 
 Bank of Italy (Visalia, California)
 Bank of Italy (Tracy, California)
 Bank of Italy (Fresno, California)
 Bank of Italy - disambiguation to landmark buildings
 Banca d'America e d'Italia, sister bank

References

Further reading 
Josephson, Matthew, "The Money Lords; the great finance capitalists, 1925-1950", New York, Weybright and Talley, 1972.

External links
 National Historic Landmarks: Bank of Italy Building, San Francisco
 Bank of Italy Building (1917), Fresno

Banks based in California
Bank of America legacy banks
1906 San Francisco earthquake
Banks established in 1904
Banks disestablished in 1929
History of San Francisco
Italian-American history
Italian-American culture in San Francisco
Working-class culture in California